Rowing at the 2019 African Games was held from 20 to 23 August 2019 in Salé, Morocco.

Participating nations

Medal table

Medal summary

Men

Women

Mixed

Results

Single sculls 1000 metres (heats)

References

External links
Results book
Rowing

2019 African Games
African Games
2019 African Games
Rowing at the African Games